Out of the Grey are a band.

Out of the Grey may also refer to:
 Out of the Grey (The Dream Syndicate album) the 1986 release by the American alternative rock band The Dream Syndicate
 Out of the Grey (Out of the Grey album) the 1991 self-titled debut album by the American Christian music band